Thomas Jong Lee, commonly known as “Tom” Lee is an American entrepreneur, financial analyst, investor, businessman, and full-time contributor on CNBC's Fast Money, Tech Check, and Closing Bell shows.

Early life and education 
Lee was born in Westland, MI, the third child of four siblings of Korean immigrant parents. His father was a retired psychiatrist and his mother a homemaker turned Subway franchise owner.

Lee received his BS in Economics from the Wharton School at the University of Pennsylvania with concentrations in Finance and Accounting. He is a CFA charterholder  and is an active member of CFA Society of New York and the NY Economic Club.

Business career 
Lee started his career in the early 1990's at Kidder, Peabody & Company then later at Salomon Smith Barney. In 1999, he joined J.P. Morgan Chase & Co as chief equity strategist.

While at J.P. Morgan, Lee's research attracted critics. In 2002, a publicly listed company Nextel was critical of Lee's research. This discord gained national media attention and was profiled in the November 22, 2002 Wall Street Journal article, Unhappy Firm Bites Back: Nextel Says, Analyze This.

In 2014, Lee left J.P Morgan to start his own research boutique advisory firm, Fundstrat Global Advisors. Lee currently serves as the Head of Research for Fundstrat Global Advisors and is an advisor to NewEdge Wealth, a CT-based wealth management firm.

Lee has been profiled by national media including the Wall Street Journal which featured Lee as the cover article, Thomas Lee Said 'Buy' as COVID-19 Caused Stock Market Meltdown  based on the investor response to several high profile investment calls made in 2020.
 
Lee is the first major Wall Street Strategist to provide formal research coverage of Bitcoin to his clients which was covered by the media at that time. He has appeared on CNBC, Fox Business, Bloomberg, Yahoo Finance, and CNN among others.

Lee's retweets from James Todoro  in early August 2020 sparked controversy as highlighted by the September 9, 2020 CNN article, A New Front in Coronavirus Disinformation: Wall Street Research stating Lee's retweets of Todaro's tweets as alleged coronavirus misinformation.

References 

1969 births
Living people
American businesspeople
American people of Korean descent
21st-century American businesspeople
21st-century American philanthropists
American financial analysts
American venture capitalists
American investors
American business writers
American technology writers
American business and financial journalists
American financial commentators
American people of South Korean descent
American television personalities
Male television personalities
People associated with cryptocurrency
People associated with Bitcoin